The 2010 4 Nations Cup was an international women's ice hockey competition held in Clarenville, Newfoundland and Labrador and St. John's, Newfoundland and Labrador from November 9 to November 13, 2010.  Games were played at the Clarenville Events Centre and Mile One Centre.  The 15th edition of the international tournament was held in Newfoundland to help Hockey Newfoundland and Labrador mark its 75th anniversary.  The teams involved were from Canada, the United States, Sweden and Finland.

Gold medal game
In the gold medal game of the 2010 4 Nations Cup, Rebecca Johnston's second goal of the game won the gold medal for Canada.  The goal came on a power play 6:21 into overtime and gave Canada a 3-2 win over the United States.  The game was Hockey Canada's 12th championship in the tournament's 15-year history.

Meaghan Mikkelson of St. Albert, Alberta, had a goal and an assist for Canada, while Shannon Szabados of Edmonton stopped 24 shots for the victory.  Julie Chu and Kendall Coyne Schofield scored for the United States. Goaltender Molly Schaus faced 52 shots, including 20 in a scoreless third period, and faced 11 shots in overtime.

Johnston notched the only goal of the first period, with 3:14 left in the period.  The U.S. jumped ahead 2-1 midway through the second period, when Chu and Coyne scored in a span of 1:17.  Mikkelson drew Canada even with 1:49 left in the third period. Kacey Bellamy picked up a tripping penalty 4:58 into overtime.  This led to Johnston scoring on a 4-on-3 power play 1:23 later. The attendance at Mile One Centre was 6,200.

Canada
November 8: The Canadian National women's team played against the St. John's Pennecon Privateers boys team. The game was contested at the glacier in Mount Pearl, Newfoundland and Labrador as a warmup for the 4 Nations Cup.  Joe Trenholm's goal with just over two minutes to go in the third period was the game-winning goal.  The Privateers triumphed by a 5-4 tally.
November 11: Canada's National Women's Team was at Duckworth and Water Street to observe Remembrance Day ceremonies in downtown St. John's.

Roster

Stats

Finland

Roster

Sweden

Roster

United States

Roster

Schedule

Awards and honors

Player of the game

References

See also
 4 Nations Cup

2010-11
2010–11 in Finnish ice hockey
2010–11 in Swedish ice hockey
2010–11 in Canadian women's ice hockey
2010–11 in American women's ice hockey
2010-11
Ice hockey in Newfoundland and Labrador
2010–11 in women's ice hockey